Villanueva, officially the Municipality of Villanueva, is a 2nd class municipality in the province of Misamis Oriental, Philippines. According to the 2020 census, it has a population of 40,419 people.

History

Long before the Spanish colonization, the place was originally named "Bongloy" by the natives called the Magahats, because of the three gigantic Bongloy trees that grew in the place where the Catholic church and town plaza stands today.

In 1830, the mission of Jasaan, an adjacent town to the north, was to establish separation from Cagayan de Oro and evangelization to as far as the towns of Sumilao, Linabo and Malitbog in the province of Bukidnon. Its center of civilization and the first Church was at "Daanglungsod" which is now the Aplaya, Jasaan, where an old kota (watchtower) still exists, thus marked the birth of Christianity in Bongloy.

Father Gregorio Parache, S.J., - (432 local historical sources of Northern Mindanao by Father Francisco Demetrio, S. J), who was the parish priest of Jasaan at that time brought a certain Captain Villanueva to Bongloy. Villanueva was a Mexican-American soldier who was one of the occupants of Balingasag Convent during the American occupation of the Philippines.

Father Parache requested Captain Villanueva to assist him in the plans and then commissioned the captain to develop a potable water and irrigation system in the Bongloy area. As the years passed, the Magahats moved eastward below the town of Claveria and began calling Bongloy as Villanueva in honor of the captain. The word Villanueva was handed down through word of mouth in the succeeding generations.

Geography

Climate

Barangays
Villanueva is politically subdivided into 11 barangays.
 Balacanas
 Dayawan
 Katipunan
 Kimaya
 Poblacion 1
 Poblacion 2
 Poblacion 3
 San Martin
 Tambobong
 Imelda
 Looc

Demographics

Economy 

The presence of companies like Philippine Sinter Corporation (PSC), STEAG State Power Inc., Purina, and recent opening Coca-Cola Bottlers Philippines Inc. contributes to the municipality's income although it is largely agricultural.

Culture 

Villanueva celebrates the feast of the Our Lady of Guadalupe every 12 December. In 2015, it celebrated its ″1st Bongloy Festival″.

References

External links

 [ Philippine Standard Geographic Code]
Philippine Census Information
Local Governance Performance Management System

Municipalities of Misamis Oriental